Blake Wesley may refer to:

 Blake Wesley (basketball), American basketball player
 Blake Wesley (ice hockey), Canadian ice hockey player

See also
 Wesley Blake, American professional wrestler